Konkan Railway Corporation Ltd., established the George Fernandes Institute of Tunnel Technology at Margao, Goa.  The foundation stone was laid during Konkan Railway Corporation Ltd.'s  silver jubilee function. The institute is named after Former Railway Minister George Fernandes and focuses on training the staff working on KRC (Konkan railway corporation) projects.

Railway Minister Suresh Prabhu and Swiss Ambassador signed a memo of understanding to help the KRCL to establish George Fernandes Institute of Tunnel Technology.

References 

Margao